Kathleen Anne Kron (born 1956) is a retired biology professor from Wake Forest University. She is known for her research on Ericaceae, a family of flowering plants.

Education 
Kron received her bachelor's degree  and her master's degree from Michigan State University in 1979 and 1982 respectively. She received her doctorate from the University of Florida in 1987. In 2020, she retired as full professor from Wake Forest University.

Kron ran a lab concerned with the large-scale relationships between flowering plants using Ericaceae as a model organism. In 2011, Rhododendron kroniae Craven, was named in honor of Kron and her work defining the evolutionary relationships within Ericaceae. Rhododendron groenlandicum (Oeder) Kron & Judd is named after Georg Christian Oeder, whose work was amended by Kron and Walter Stephen Judd.

The standard author abbreviation Kron is used to indicate this person as the author when citing a botanical name.

Selected publications

References

21st-century American biologists
1956 births
Living people
American women biologists
American women botanists
Wake Forest University faculty
Michigan State University alumni
University of Florida alumni
Scientists from Michigan
20th-century American botanists
21st-century American botanists
21st-century biologists
20th-century American women scientists
21st-century American women scientists
American women academics